Fantasia & Anthony Hamilton: Live in Concert is a co-headlining concert tour by American recording artists, Fantasia Barrino and Anthony Hamilton. Primarily visiting the United States, the tour began on April 21 in Buffalo, New York's Shea's Performing Arts Center and ended on June 19 in Charlotte, North Carolina's Bojangles' Coliseum.

Opening acts 
 Kevin Simpson (comedian)

Critical reception 
According to Singersroom, "Anthony Hamilton and Fantasia took fans on a musical journey and sang from the heart. Both singers added a modern twist to their Southern sound which was a plus because it exemplifies their originality and creativity. The concert was a great way to start off the spring tour for R&B music. These two entertainers touch people hearts through song because they made you laugh, cry, smile, and re-discover your purpose in life."

Setlist 
The following setlists were obtained from the June 10, 2016 concert; held at the Starlight Theatre in Kansas City, Missouri. It does not represents all concerts for the duration of the tour.
Fantasia
"Instrumental Sequence" 
"Change Your Mind" 
"Selfish (I Want You to Myself)"
"Don't Act Right"
"Instrumental Sequence"  
"Without Me" 
"I'm Doin' Me" 
"Instrumental Sequence"
"Summertime"
"Bittersweet"
"Proud Mary" 
"Nasty Girl" / "The Bird"
"Instrumental Sequence"
"When I See U" 
"Lose to Win" 
"Truth Is" / "Free Yourself" / "Ain't Gon' Beg You"
"Sleeping with the One I Love"

Anthony Hamilton
"Save Me"
"Cool"
"Comin' from Where I'm From"
"What I'm Feelin'"
"Best of Me"
"Amen"
"The Point of it All"
"Hotline Bling" / "Respek"
"Soul's on Fire"
"Still"
"Charlene"
"So in Love"

Tour Dates

Box office score data

External links 
 Fantasia Official Website
 Anthony Hamilton Official Website

References 

2016 concert tours
Co-headlining concert tours
Fantasia Barrino concert tours